Canadian singer Nelly Furtado has released six studio albums, 28 singles, one video album, one live album, two compilation albums, three extended plays, and 23 music videos. She released her debut album Whoa, Nelly! in 2000 and it became a commercial success selling 6 million copies worldwide. It has been certified multi Platinum in countries such as Canada, United States, Australia and New Zealand. The album spawned four singles including the successful top 10 hits "I'm Like a Bird" and "Turn Off the Light". In 2003 she released her second album Folklore, while the album did not match the success of her previous album in such markets as the US and Australia, it did however become a success in several European countries. Folklore has sold 2 million copies worldwide. The album produced two European top 10 hits: "Powerless (Say What You Want)" and  "Força", while "Try" peaked inside the top 10 in Canada.

Her third album Loose (2006) was the best selling album of her career, with 10 million copies sold worldwide. It reached number one on the album charts of nine countries and was certified multi-platinum in several countries such as Canada, UK, Australia, Germany, Switzerland, Austria and New Zealand. The album spawned four successful number one singles: "Promiscuous", "Maneater", "Say It Right" and "All Good Things (Come to an End)". Loose was one of the best selling albums of 2006–2007 and is twenty-second best-selling album of the 2000s. She released her first Spanish language album Mi Plan in 2009 which became a success in Europe and on the Latin charts. The lead single "Manos al Aire" became a European top 10 hit and also topped the Billboard Hot Latin Songs chart, making Furtado the first North American singer to reach number one on that chart with an original Spanish song. Mi Plan has been certified Platinum (Latin) in the US. In 2010 she released a remix album Mi Plan Remixes and her first greatest hits The Best of Nelly Furtado. Furtado released her fifth album The Spirit Indestructible in 2012, followed by The Ride in 2017.

Albums

Studio albums

Compilation albums

Live albums

Video albums

Extended plays

Singles

As main artist

As featured artist

Promotional singles

Other appearances

Music videos

Featured music videos

Cameo appearances

Notes

References

Discographies of Canadian artists
Discography
Pop music discographies